The 2022–23 season is the 53rd season in the existence of Paris Saint-Germain F.C. and the club's 49th consecutive season in the top flight of French football. In addition to the domestic league, they participated in this season's editions of the Coupe de France and the UEFA Champions League, having secured an eleventh Trophée des Champions at the start of the season.

Kits

Season summary

Pre-season
Ahead of the 2022–23 season, it was announced that Leonardo Araújo, sporting director, had been dismissed, and that star forward Kylian Mbappé had signed a contract extension, choosing to remain at the club. The season is the first without the services of Ángel Di María at Paris Saint-Germain since the 2014–15 season. On 31 May, PSG completed the permanent transfer Portuguese left-back Nuno Mendes, who signed with the club until 30 June 2026. On 10 June 2022, Luís Campos joined the club as Football Advisor, being responsible for recruitment of new players. Campos's first signing of the summer was Portuguese midfielder Vitinha, in a transfer worth €41.5 million. On 5 July 2022, Christophe Galtier replaced Mauricio Pochettino as the club's head coach. The signing of which lended a lot of credibility to the club/s new policy of no "bling-bling". This was stated by the club's president at a presentation for the new head coach. 

On 17th July the club confirmed the signing of Hugo Ekitike initially on a loan deal, which included a clause for a permanent transfer to the club. The signing was quickly followed by reports that club were now free to pursue alternative targets in a focused manner, specifically reaching out for players from the Paris region. Though initial reports were skeptical, the club quickly proved this to be true by signing Nordi Mukiele from RB Leipzig. In continuation of the club's new transfer policy, the club then launched a bid for Renato Sanches who played for Lille. After a few weeks of negotiations the player was then signed on the 4 August.

Players

First-team squad
As of 31 January 2022.

Elite group

Out on loan

Transfers

In

Out

Pre-season and friendlies 

PSG started the pre-season on 4 July. The club returned to training on 7 December, with the participation of players who were not at the 2022 FIFA World Cup.

Competitions

Overall record

Ligue 1

League table

Results summary

Results by round

Matches
The league fixtures were announced on 17 June 2022.

Coupe de France

Trophée des Champions

UEFA Champions League

Group stage

The group stage draw was held on 25 August 2022.

Knockout phase

Round of 16
The draw for the round of 16 was held on 7 November 2022.

Statistics

Appearances and goals

|-
! colspan="16" style="background:#dcdcdc; text-align:center"| Goalkeepers

|-
! colspan="16" style="background:#dcdcdc; text-align:center"| Defenders

|-
! colspan="16" style="background:#dcdcdc; text-align:center"| Midfielders

|-
! colspan="16" style="background:#dcdcdc; text-align:center"| Forwards

|-
! colspan="16" style="background:#dcdcdc; text-align:center"| Players transferred out during the season

Goals

References

Paris Saint-Germain F.C. seasons
Paris Saint-Germain
Paris Saint-Germain